The 'Taipei Baboons' is a Rugby Union team based in Taipei, Taiwan.

See also
 Rugby union in Taiwan

Sport in Taipei
Rugby union in Taiwan
Rugby clubs established in 1990